Pat Marsh (1933/1934 – 3 May 2017) was a British ice hockey administrator. She served as secretary of the British Ice Hockey Association from 1972 to 1987, and was previously secretary to Bunny Ahearne beginning in 1953. She also worked in the International Ice Hockey Federation (IIHF) office for more than 20 years, represented Great Britain at IIHF congresses. She 
was inducted into the British Ice Hockey Hall of Fame for her work in Great Britain, and received the Paul Loicq Award for her work in international ice hockey.

Career
Marsh first attended an ice hockey game in 1950. She began working for Bunny Ahearne as his secretary at the British Ice Hockey Association (BIHA) in 1953. Ahearne's hiring of Marsh coincided with his term as secretary of the BIHA, and his alternating roles as president and vice-president of the International Ice Hockey Federation (IIHF). Ahearne became president of the BIHA in 1971, and Marsh took his place as the BIHA secretary in 1972.

Marsh occasionally travelled with BIHA junior teams, and was in Barcelona when the Great Britain men's national under-18 ice hockey team won a gold medal in 1986. Marsh also worked in the IIHF office for more than 20 years. She represented the BIHA and Great Britain at annual IIHF congresses.

Later life
Marsh retired from her position as secretary of the BIHA in 1987, after 24 years of service, and was succeeded by David Pickles. At the time she was remembered as being "well-liked but now overworked". After retiring, she continued as a special consultant for the BIHA until 1999. Marsh was inducted into British Ice Hockey Hall of Fame for her contributions to ice hockey in Great Britain. She also received the Paul Loicq Award in 2002, for her work in international ice hockey.

Marsh died on 3 May 2017 at the age of 83, which would indicate she was born in either 1933 or 1934. Past BIHA president Freddie Meredith remarked that Marsh devoted a lifetime to the sport of ice hockey, and that its growth in Great Britain during the 1980s and the 1990s would have been impossible without Marsh's efforts, saying that "she was truly the first lady of British Ice Hockey". The funeral for Marsh was scheduled for 12 May 2017, in Kent.

See also
Ice hockey in the United Kingdom
List of members of the British Ice Hockey Hall of Fame

References

1930s births
2017 deaths
20th-century British women
21st-century British women
British Ice Hockey Hall of Fame inductees
British ice hockey people
British sports executives and administrators
British women in business
International Ice Hockey Federation
Paul Loicq Award recipients
People from Kent